Pseudoedaspis is a genus of tephritid  or fruit flies in the family Tephritidae.

Species
Pseudoedaspis biseta Hendel, 1914
Pseudoedaspis decorata (Blanchard, 1854)
Pseudoedaspis mendozana Aczél, 1953
Pseudoedaspis oreiplana (Kieffer & Jörgensen, 1910)
Pseudoedaspis striolata (Blanchard, 1854)

References

Tephritinae
Tephritidae genera
Diptera of South America